The Future That Was is the second and final studio album by Josh Joplin Group.  Like Useful Music, it did not enjoy commercial success.

Track listing
All songs written by Josh Joplin
 "Must Be You" – 3:13
 "Wonderful Ones" – 3:12
 "Listening" – 4:07
 "Siddhartha's of Suburbia" – 3:11
 "It's Only Entertainment" – 3:01
 "Dishes" – 2:52
 "I Am Not The Only Cowboy" – 4:04
 "Lucky" – 4:05
 "Trampoline" – 2:59
 "Fire" – 3:11
 "Happy At Last" – 2:53
 "The Future That Was" – 2:50
 "Wonder Wheel" – 5:00

External links
The Future That Was review - Musictap.net, 11/9/2002.
The Future That Was review - The Daily Vault, 1/15/2003.

Josh Joplin albums
2002 albums
Artemis Records albums